Lieutenant General Bongani Mbatha  was a South African Army officer who served as Chief of Logistics for the South African National Defence Force from 2014–2015.

Awards and decorations

References

 

South African Army generals
1957 births
2015 deaths